Kavske is a village in Stryi Raion, Lviv Oblast in western Ukraine. It belongs to Stryi urban hromada, one of the hromadas of Ukraine. 
Local government is administered by Kavska village council. The population of the village is about 1453 people.

Geography 
The village is located on the road from Uhersko to small town Medenychi.

History and Attractions 
The first written mention dates back to year 1334. 
In the village Kavske is preserved ANCIENT RUSS STRENGTHENED SETTLEMENTS 11  —18 centuries (Bych and Yosypovychi). But archaeological excavations have revealed traces of Stone Age settlements (third millennium BC).

Famous people 
 Jeremiah Lomnytskyj (February 8, 1860 – July 3, 1916) – Ukrainian Basilian priest, missionary and an educational and church activist, the founder of the religious congregation of the Sisters Servants of Mary Immaculate. Servant of God.

References

External links 
 village Kavske
 weather.in.ua
 paraskeva.org.ua

Literature 
 

Villages in Stryi Raion